EBD may refer to:

Health and medicine 
 Emotional and behavioral disorders
 Epidermolysis bullosa dystrophica
 Evidence-based dentistry
 Extensor digitorum brevis

Other uses 
 Ebbsfleet International railway station, in England
 Elections and Boundaries Department of Belize
 Electronic brakeforce distribution
 Evidence-based design
 Exim Bank (Djibouti), a commercial bank